Dennis Glen Patterson (born December 30, 1948) is a Canadian politician and lawyer. He served as MLA for Frobisher Bay and Iqaluit from 1978 to 1995, as NWT Minister of Education, Justice and Municipal Affairs and was chosen as the fifth premier of Northwest Territories from 1987 to 1991. He headed the campaign that led to the creation of Nunavut in 1999.

Patterson is currently a member of the Law Society of Nunavut. In the past he has served as a director of the Northwest Territories Law Foundation and as chair of the Northwest Territories and Nunavut Legal Services Board until 2000. He became a private consultant in 2001.

Patterson was named to the Senate of Canada by Stephen Harper on August 27, 2009. He represented Nunavut as a Conservative until February 4, 2022, when he announced he would be leaving the Conservative Senators Group to join the Canadian Senators Group in protest over other Conservative members support of the "Freedom Convoy" protests.

References

External links 
 
 Official site 

1948 births
Living people
21st-century Canadian politicians
Members of the Legislative Assembly of the Northwest Territories
Members of the United Church of Canada
Politicians from Vancouver
Premiers of the Northwest Territories
Canadian senators from Nunavut
Canadian Senators Group
Conservative Party of Canada senators
Canadian lawyers
Lawyers in Nunavut
People from Iqaluit